Prem Mandir may refer to:

 Prem Mandir, Rajkot, a Syro-Malabar Catholic cathedral in Gujarat, India
 Prem Mandir, Vrindavan, a religious and spiritual complex in Uttar Pradesh, India